Madinat Khalifa North is a north-western district of Doha, Qatar. It is one of the two sections of Madinat Khalifa, the other being Madinat Khalifa South. The district was constructed in the 1970s by the Emir of Qatar at the time, Sheikh Khalifa bin Hamad Al Thani, primarily to serve as a residential district for Qatari families.

The district is situated between the adjacent city of Al Rayyan and downtown Doha.

Etymology
In Arabic, "madinat" means city. The second part of the name was received from Khalifa bin Hamad Al Thani, who was emir of Qatar from 1972 to 1995 and who oversaw the district's development. Finally, the "north" component is used to differentiate from the Madinat Khalifa South district.

Landmarks
Madinat Khalifa Health Center on Al Najda Street.
Qatar College of Technology (Men's Section) on Al Karaana Street.
Al Meera Supercenter on Al Deebel Street.
Q-Post branch on Al Deebel Street.
Al Ghariya Park on Omar bin Maabad Street.
North Khalifa City Park on Al Rajaa Street.
Fereej Madinat Khalifa North Stadium (managed by the Qatar Olympic Committee) on Al Nashamiya Street.
International Centre for Sport Security on Al Markhiya Street.
The Traffic Department on Khalifa Street. Geographically, it is in Madinat Khalifa South, although the Ministry of Municipality and Environment lists its address as Madinat Khalifa North.

Transport
Currently, the underground Madinat Khalifa North Metro Station is under construction, having been launched during Phase 2A. Once completed, it will be part of Doha Metro's Green Line. It is to the west of the Madinat Khalifa Metro Station.

Education
The following schools are located in Madinat Khalifa North:

References

Doha
Communities in Doha